Walker Branch is a stream in Reynolds County in the U.S. state of Missouri. It is a tributary of the East Fork Black River.

Walker Branch has the name of the local Walker family.

See also
List of rivers of Missouri

References

Rivers of Reynolds County, Missouri
Rivers of Missouri